Component-Integrated ACE ORB, a CORBA Component Model (CCM) implementation
 CIAO: Columbia International Affairs Online, an electronic database from Columbia University Press
 CIAO (AM): Radio station at 790 kHz in Brampton, Ontario
 CHLO (AM): Radio station at 530 kHz in Brampton, Ontario, that once held the CIAO call sign

See also 
 Ciao (disambiguation)